Dr. Warren Bertram Snyder (2 March 1903 in Toronto, Ontario – 27 March 1957) was a Canadian athlete and doctor. Snyder competed for Canada in Rowing in the 1924 Summer Olympics. Snyder won the silver medal as crew member of the Canadian boat in the eights event.

References

External links
Olympic profile
Warren Snyder's profile at Sports Reference.com

1903 births
1957 deaths
Rowers from Toronto
Players of Canadian football from Ontario
Toronto Varsity Blues football players
Canadian male rowers
Olympic rowers of Canada
Rowers at the 1924 Summer Olympics
Olympic silver medalists for Canada
Olympic medalists in rowing
Medalists at the 1924 Summer Olympics
Canadian coroners